The Booth Papers are a collection of philatelic research documents of Roger Booth FRPSL used for the preparation of his catalogues of British and Irish revenue stamps. The papers form part of the British Library Philatelic Department Collections and were donated to the Library in 2004.

References

Further reading
Judicial Stamps of Great Britain and Pre-1922 Ireland by Roger Booth and Clive Akerman, 1997.

See also
 Revenue stamps of the United Kingdom

British Library Philatelic Collections
Revenue stamps
Philately of the United Kingdom